This is a list of polytechnics institutions in Ghana. These institutions are not accredited degree granting institutions. For a list of Universities and other degree granting institutions see List of universities in Ghana.

Public polytechnics & Select polytechnics

See also
List of universities in Ghana

References
Polytechnics in Ghana - Ghana Schools Online

Polytechnics in Ghana
Polytechnics